William Coxe Jr. (May 3, 1762 – February 25, 1831) was a pioneer pomologist and a U.S. Representative from New Jersey. He served as Mayor of Burlington, New Jersey.

Biography
Born in Burlington, New Jersey.  His father was William Coxe.  His mothers name was Mary Francis.  William Coxe Jr. served as a member of the New Jersey General Assembly 1796–1804 from 1806 to 1809, and again in 1816 and 1817. He served as speaker 1798–1800 and again in 1802. Coxe was elected as a Federalist to the Thirteenth Congress (March 4, 1813 – March 3, 1815).

Coxe is better known as a pomologist. He maintained the first experimental orchard in America. His A View of Cultivation of Fruit Trees, and the Management of Orchards and Cider (1817) was the first book on pomology written by an American or about American fruit trees. The illustrated book, more than 250 pages in length, had chapters on apples, pears, quince, peaches, plums, apricots, nectarines, and cherries. It included historical discussions and descriptions of both tree and the fruit.

William Coxe Jr. and his brother Tench Coxe were abolitionists.  Tench was a political economist and abolitionist leader.  He was a founding member and secretary of the Pennsylvania Society for Promoting the Abolition of Slavery located in Philadelphia around 1787.  William was a member and delegate of the New Jersey Society for Promoting the Abolition of Slavery.  It was founded in 1793.  Their distant relative was radical abolitionist Samuel Hanson Cox.

William married Rachel Smith.  He had eight children with Rachel Smith.  She was the daughter of Richard Smith and the only heir to a massive fortune.  He received a massive amount of inheritance from his wife's family.  As a gesture to his wife, he made a will leaving her an estate in Pennsylvania and New York on January 15, 1822.  The names of the eight children were Maria, Margaret, Anne, Harriet, Emily, William Smith, Richard Smith and Elizabeth.

He died in Burlington, New Jersey, on February 25, 1831. He was interred in St. Mary's Churchyard.

See also
Chauncey Colton
Albert Taylor Bledsoe

References

Bibliography

1762 births
1831 deaths
Speakers of the New Jersey General Assembly
Members of the New Jersey General Assembly
People from Burlington, New Jersey
Federalist Party members of the United States House of Representatives from New Jersey
Mayors of Burlington, New Jersey
Pomologists